Aleksandr Valeryevich Guzhov (born 17 February 1978) is a former Russian professional footballer.

Club career
He made his professional debut in the Russian Third League in 1995 for FC TRASKO Moscow. He played 1 game in the UEFA Intertoto Cup 1997 for FC Torpedo-Luzhniki Moscow.

References

1978 births
Living people
Russian footballers
Association football midfielders
FC Torpedo Moscow players
FC Torpedo-2 players
FC KAMAZ Naberezhnye Chelny players
Russian Premier League players
FC FShM Torpedo Moscow players